Gina Rodriguez (born November 15, 1967) is an American former pornographic actress known for her work with "D-Listers" such as Nadya Suleman and Michael Lohan. In 2017 she starred in and executive produced the WEtv docu-series Mama June: From Not to Hot. 

From 2011 to 2017, Rodriguez managed Stormy Daniels, and cooperated with FBI and was heavily involved in the deal with Keith Davidson regarding President Trump. In 2018, she was a subject of the book, Full Disclosure, written by Stormy Daniels and published by St. Martin's Publishing Group. In 2020, she was a subject of the book, The Fixers: The Bottom-Feeders, Crooked Lawyers, Gossipmongers, and Porn Stars Who Created the 45th President, written by reporters Joe Palazzolo and Michael Rothfeld and published by Random House. The same year, she also became a subject of a second book, Disloyal: A Memoir, written by Michael Cohen, the former attorney for the 45th President Donald Trump, and published by Skyhorse.

Career 

As an adult film performer, Rodriguez appeared over 50 adult films under the name Demi Delia. Rodriguez appeared on Baywatch in 1992 and Robbery Homicide Division in 2002. Rodriguez established her publicity business in 2009 after leaving porn business and having divorced for the third time. Starting in June 2009, along with her two children, she starred in the family's short-lived, web-based reality show, Mommy XXX on Crackle.

Rodriguez created her own management company, DD Entertainment (later known as GR Media), which represented women who notoriously claimed to be mistresses of various celebrities. In 2012, she launched DialAStar.com in 2012 a phone service which allowed fans to phone celebrities. As Nadya Suleman's manager, she produced and marketed the pornographic film Octomom Home Alone.

In 2017, she co-founded GiToni Productions, and executive produced her first reality TV show, "Mama June: From Not to Hot" on WE tv, on which she also starred. The show is currently airing in its fourth season.

In 2020 she executive produced "Happily Ever Altered" which premiered July 22, 2020, on Lifetime TV.

Personal life 
Gina was born Gina Marie Delia, daughter of infamous Mexican mafia head Michael "Micky" Anthony Delia and became estranged from her family at a young age.

References

External links 

 
 
 

1967 births
Living people
American actresses of Mexican descent
American female adult models
American pornographic film actresses
Female models from California